I'm Going Home may refer to:

I'm Going Home (film), a 2001 French/Portuguese film written and directed by Manoel de Oliveira
"I'm Going Home" (Rocky Horror song), a song from The Rocky Horror Picture Show
"I'm Going Home", a song by The Choir
"I'm Going Home", a song by The Kingston Trio from The Kingston Trio (Nick Bob John)
"I'm Going Home", a song by Mickey & Sylvia, B-side of the single "Love Is Strange"
"I'm Going Home", a song by Sacred Harp Singers from the Cold Mountain soundtrack
"I'm Going Home", a song by Tanita Tikaram from Everybody's Angel
"I'm Going Home", a song by Ten Years After from Undead
"I'm Going Home", a song by The Zombies from Zombie Heaven

See also
"Home" (Daughtry song)
Going Home (disambiguation)